Blood is a 2000 horror film directed and written by Charly Cantor and starring Adrian Rawlins, Lee Blakemore, and Phil Cornwell.

Premise 
A doctor who engineered a woman with narcotic blood encounters his creation 20 years later and falls in love with her.

Reception
JoBlo.com gave the film 8/10 in their review. Author Clive Davies also found the film enjoyable, stating that it was slow and talk heavy but with several interesting ideas. It was also reviewed by author Stephen Jones.

See also
 Cinema of the United Kingdom
 Vampire films

References

Further reading

External links 
 

2000 films
British horror films
2000 horror films
Films shot in England
2000s English-language films
2000s British films